Nathaniel Warren Seth Motte (born January 13, 1984) is an American recording artist, record producer, and film composer from Boulder, Colorado. He is a member of the electropop duo 3OH!3 with Sean Foreman.

Life and career
Motte was born to a French mother and an American father, Dr. Warren Motte, distinguished professor of French Literature at the University of Colorado at Boulder. He has one brother.

Motte attended Foothills Elementary, Casey Middle School, Boulder High School, and the University of Colorado at Boulder. In 2006 he graduated with a degree in environmental, population, & organismic biology. The following year Motte was accepted to medical school at the University of Colorado Health Sciences Center.

Motte took piano lessons at a young age, and began to play guitar at home with his brother and father. He began to DJ at age 18, playing in local bars and clubs in Boulder. He began producing music shortly thereafter, using programs like Acid and Reason to make songs at home while he was attending the University of Colorado. He now uses primarily Logic Pro as his production program, although he continues to work in other programs.

Motte co-writes and produces all of 3OH!3's music, employing both analog technologies and virtual production tools. He musically directs 3OH!3's live show. He has written and produced songs for Shape Shifters and Jeffree Star. He co-produced and co-wrote the song "Hey" for Lil Jon in 2009. He released a collaborative album The Child Star with Awol One on Fake Four Inc. in 2011. He co-wrote and co-produced the song "Love Somebody" for Maroon 5 in 2012.

In 2014, Motte produced a song for iSH called "Renegades." He was also a writer/producer for DCF aka Prince Caspian's singles "Jealous" and "Twenty Something" from the album "Pop Songs."

In addition to co-writing and producing, Motte also composes for film, television, and video games. He scored a short movie in 2007 called Uberts (a French Film).

3OH!3's fourth studio album, Night Sports, was released by Fueled By Ramen on May 13, 2016.

On July 11, 2016, Motte announced on Instagram that he had proposed to his longtime girlfriend, TV host Liz Trinnear, on July 7, 2016. A year later on July 7, 2017, they got married on Flagstaff Mountain in Boulder, Colorado. In January 2023, it was announced Trinnear and Motte were expecting their first child.

Discography

Awol One & Nathaniel Motte
 The Child Star (2011)

As a songwriter and producer

Scoring

Filmography

Television appearances

References

External links
 
 

1984 births
American male singer-songwriters
University of Colorado Boulder alumni
Living people
Musicians from Boulder, Colorado
Musicians from Lincoln, Nebraska
21st-century American singers
21st-century American male singers
Singer-songwriters from Colorado
Singer-songwriters from Nebraska